"Lefty" Lew Tendler (September 28, 1898 in Philadelphia, Pennsylvania – November 5, 1970 in Atlantic City, New Jersey) was an American boxer. He is generally considered one of the best boxers to never have won a world title, though he was a top rated contender for both the world light and welterweight championships.  Statistical boxing website BoxRec lists Tendler as the #10 ranked lightweight of all time, while The Ring Magazine founder Nat Fleischer placed him at #9. He is a member of the International Jewish Sports Hall of Fame, the Ring Magazine Hall of Fame, the World Boxing Hall of Fame,  and the International Boxing Hall of Fame.

Early life and career
On September 28, 1898, in the South Philadelphia Jewish ghetto, Lew Tendler was born. Only two years after his birth, his father passed away after a protracted illness, leaving the family in dire financial problems. He began selling newspapers on a city street corner at the age of six, defending his territory from fierce rivals with his fists.  He began boxing as an amateur around twelve, often competing in tournaments at local burlesque houses.  Turning pro in 1913 at the age of fifteen, he began his career as a bantamweight.  His first bout on November 6, 1918, against Mickey Brown, was arranged by Phil Glassman and the Philadelphia Newsboy Association.

In an important early career win, Tendler decisively defeated future world bantamweight champion Pete Herman on February 28, 1916, in six rounds, repeatedly scoring points with his right.  Herman had difficulty mounting an effective defense, and bled from his nose through much of the bout where he caught frequent rights from Tendler.  Herman would take the world bantamweight championship the following year and hold it almost continuously for four years.

Close bouts with champion Johnny Dundee, 1917 
On October 1, 1917, Tendler defeated future world junior lightweight champion Johnny Dundee in a close six-round newspaper decision in Philadelphia.  Tendler took the lead in most of the fighting, used his reach advantage to dominate at long range, and landed more blows to take the decision.  He finished strong in the sixth.  On March 26, 1917, Tendler had previously defeated Dundee in another very close six-round newspaper decision of two Philadelphia papers, though one reporter felt the power of Dundee's blows to the head and body should have won him the decision.

Future world lightweight champion Rocky Kansas fell to Tendler on October 29, 1917 in a somewhat decisive six-round newspaper decision in Philadelphia according to a decision of the Philadelphia Record.  Tendler scored with straight lefts, upper cuts and right crosses, and had the better of much of the fighting. In a closer first round, Kansas landed a powerful right to Tendler's ear.  In two other meetings with Kansas, Tendler won a ten-round newspaper decision on New Years Day, 1919, but dropped a fifteen-round points decision on October 21, 1921 at New York's  Madison Square Garden.

Tendler first decisively defeated Willie Jackson, a leading contender for the lightweight title in a six-round newspaper decision in Philadelphia, on January 7, 1918. Tendler forced the fighting from the opening round, showed better defense, and gave Jackson a beating in nearly every round.  Jackson was able to score only when coming out of clinches at close range. Tendler defeated Jackson again that year in a fifteen-round points decision in New Haven, and continued to gain victory over Jackson in Philadelphia and Milwaukee by newspaper decisions once a year from 1919 to 1921.

George "KO" Chaney first fell to Tendler on September 18, 1918 in a six-round newspaper decision in Philadelphia.  Tendler knocked down Chaney for a count of six in the third round.  Tendler scored best in the first three and final rounds.  Tendler would also defeat Chaney in a first-round knockout on June 4, 1919 at Philadelphia's Shibe Park.  A left to the jaw preceded by a hard right to the same spot put Chaney down for the count only 1:12 into the first round.  Chaney was one of Tendler's more skilled early opponents.

Tendler first defeated fellow Jewish boxer Frankie Callahan, another leading contender for the lightweight title, on July 6, 1918 in an eight-round newspaper decision in Atlantic City.  In three other meetings, Tendler won a six-round newspaper decision in Philadelphia, a ninth-round technical knockout in Boston where Callahan broke his wrist, and a rough fifth-round technical knockout at an open-air arena in Lawrence, Massachusetts, on September 18, 1920, where Callahan told his manager he had broken a rib in the second round.  Callahan fought through three more rounds, but was unable to answer the bell for the sixth.

Attempts at lightweight championship against Benny Leonard, 1922-3
On July 27, 1922, Tendler fell to fellow Jewish boxer Benny Leonard in a twelve-round newspaper decision in Jersey City in a lightweight world title match, that may have been the most remarkable bout of Tendler's career.  Before a record audience of over 60,000 enthralled fans, Leonard won five rounds, Tendler four, with three even.  Tendler may have led in the first five rounds, as Leonard could not adjust to or penetrate his unique Southpaw stance, style, and defense.  In the eighth, Tendler crashed a terrific left to the midsection which had followed a left to the head, and Leonard held on to Tendler as he sank to one knee.  Then Leonard rose and distracted Tendler by mumbling a few words, then going to a clinche to rest for much of the remainder of the round.  Tendler never delivered the follow up knockout blow, and Leonard, getting time to recover, dominated the next seven rounds.  In their last meeting on July 24, 1923, Leonard won a unanimous fifteen-round decision at Yankee Stadium before an extraordinary crowd of 58,000.  The bout took place in the Bronx in another lightweight world title match. Leonard excelled in the speed and precision of his attack, while still managing to ward off most of his opponent's blows, particularly Tendler's strong left. Leonard demonstrated his mastery of ring tactics against an opponent who became sluggish, and was unable to mount the offensive he had shown in their bout the previous July.  By one account, Leonard managed to land three blows for every one of Tendler's, demonstrating his speed and mastery of tactics. With the huge crowd, Leonard's take home pay exceeded $130,000, an extraordinary sum for the era.

Tendler first defeated Sailor Friedman, a highly rated lightweight, on December 16, 1921, in an eight-round newspaper decision at New York's Madison Square Garden.  Tendler floored Friedman four times in the second round in the Garden.  Friedman came back hard in the fourth, staggering Tendler with a left to the jaw, and performed well in the fifth.  The combatants went back and forth in the following rounds, though Friedman continued do land a few solid blows as late as the twelfth and fourteenth.   In three previous meetings that year, on September 13, August 24, and February 28, Tendler won in newspaper decisions in Milwaukee, and Philadelphia.

Tendler defeated reigning world light heavyweight champion Pinky Mitchell in their last meeting on February 18, 1924 in a close ten-round newspaper decision in Milwaukee.  The Wisconsin State Journal considered the non-title bout slow and wrote that Tendler's blows lacked steam.  Had Mitchell been two pounds lighter, and been knocked out, Tendler would have taken the junior welterweight championship.  Tendler had defeated Mitchell in a previous meeting on May 19, 1920 in another ten-round newspaper decision in Milwaukee.  Tendler got his range in the final seven rounds, and won points for taking the offense through most of the bout.  His defense was exceptional, though Mitchell's defense kept him from harm and he benefited somewhat from greater reach.

Attempt at welterweight championship against Mickey Walker, 1924

Tendler fell to Mickey Walker in a ten-round unanimous decision on June 2, 1924 in an attempt at the National Boxing Association (NBA) world welterweight championship.  The Pittsburgh Post gave Walker five rounds with only the seventh and eighth to Tendler.  In a fast and exciting bout, Tendler drove Walker from rope to rope in the seventh with rights and lefts to the body and head, looking like he might take the decision. Walker had an edge in the final two rounds, however, as Tendler tired, and scored most frequently with blows to the body.

Tendler was knocked out only once in his career on January 19, 1925 against Jack Zivic in Pittsburgh.  In the fifth round, a left by Zivic sent Tendler spinning to the floor for a count of nine.  Another left hurt Tendler, and than a barrage of lefts and rights sent him to the canvas again.  Tendler's manager Phil Glassman threw in the towel ending the fight.  In a rematch, however, in Philadelphia five months later before 30,000 fans, Tendler dominated in a ten-round unanimous decision at Shibe Park. The Pittsburgh Gazette Times gave Tendler seven of ten rounds, particularly the last half of the bout, and wrote that he "outboxed, outslugged, and outpunched" Zivic, particularly in the closing rounds.

In one of his last bouts with a top talent on July 16, 1925, Tendler drew with future world welterweight champion Joe Dundee by decision, in ten fast and hard-fought rounds before 10,000 at Shibe Park in Philadelphia. Tendler was rocked several times by the younger Dundee's rapid right, and took a serious beating in several rounds.   Dundee caught Tendler off balance in the ninth with a left hook, and he fell briefly to his hands.  The more skilled ring veteran Tendler was forced to clinch at times.  The Philadelphia Inquirer believed Dundee had the better of the bout, and many in the audience felt the same.  Tendler mounted an effective defense, however, and often went on the offensive during the fast bout.

Life after boxing

After retiring from boxing in 1928, Tendler opened a restaurant in Philadelphia in 1932 which specialized in steaks, known as Tendler's Tavern. He later opened branches in Atlantic City and Miami Beach.  Around 1911, he married Celia Lasker, with whom he had three sons.  Lew and Celia remained married throughout his life.

Tendler died on November 7, 1970 at Shore Memorial Hospital in Somers Point, a suburb of Atlantic City, New Jersey, of an arterial clot.  His memorial service was in Philadelphia, and he was buried in nearby Roosevelt Memorial Park in Trevose, Pennsylvania, a Philadelphia suburb.  He left nine grandchildren.

Professional boxing record
All information in this section is derived from BoxRec, unless otherwise stated.

Official record

All newspaper decisions are officially regarded as “no decision” bouts and are not counted in the win/loss/draw column.

Unofficial record

Record with the inclusion of newspaper decisions in the win/loss/draw column.

See also
List of select Jewish boxers

References

External links
 
International Boxing Hall of Fame - Lew Tendler
Cyber Boxing Zone - Lew Tendler

1898 births
1970 deaths
Boxers from Philadelphia
Lightweight boxers
Welterweight boxers
Jewish American boxers
Jewish boxers
American male boxers
20th-century American Jews